Astra 1C was a geostationary communications satellite launched in 1993 by the Société Européenne des Satellites (SES), now SES Astra. The satellite remained in service until 2011 and is now derelict.

History 
Astra 1C was the third communications satellite placed in orbit by SES, and was originally deployed at the Astra 19.2°E orbital position.

The satellite was intended to be replaced in 2002, along with Astra 1B, by Astra 1K but this satellite failed to reach its intended orbit. It was eventually relieved of its remaining television/radio payloads by Astra 1KR in 2006.

In November 2006, prior to the launch of Astra 1L to the 19.2° East position, Astra 1C was placed in an inclined orbit and moved first to 2.0° East for tests, and then in February 2007 to 4.6° East, notionally part of the Astra 5°E cluster of satellites but largely unused.

After November 2008, the satellite operated back at 2.0° East, in an inclined orbit. On 2 November 2011, the satellite was taken out of use as Eutelsat, the rightholder for the 3° allocation, came on air with Eutelsat 3A and current rules ask for a minimum of 2° separation. In the summer of 2014, the satellite was moved to 73° West, close to SES' AMC-6 satellite, to 1.2° West, to 152° West, to 40° West next to SES-6, to 91° East in January 2015  and continuously moving west by approximately 5.2° per day to reach 164° East at the end of 2015.

See also 

 Astra 19.2°E previous orbital position
 Astra 5°E previous orbital position
 SES S.A. satellite owner

References

External links 
 OnAstra - Official consumers/viewers' site
 - SES guide to receiving Astra satellites
 - SES guide to channels broadcasting on Astra satellites

Astra satellites
Derelict satellites orbiting Earth
Satellites using the BSS-601 bus
1993 in Luxembourg
Satellites of Luxembourg
Spacecraft launched in 1993